Nikola Cuckić (born 11 April 1997) is a Serbian professional footballer who plays as a midfielder for FC Caspiy.

References

External links
 
 

1997 births
Living people
People from Gjilan
Association football midfielders
Serbian footballers
Serbian expatriate footballers
FK Radnički Niš players
OFK Beograd players
FK Mladost Lučani players
FK Zemun players
FK Javor Ivanjica players
FC Aktobe players
FC Caspiy players
Serbian First League players
Serbian SuperLiga players
Kazakhstan First Division players
Serbian expatriate sportspeople in Kazakhstan
Expatriate footballers in Kazakhstan